is a Japanese motorcycle racer. He competes in the British Superbike Championship on a factory-supported Honda Fireblade.

Takahashi has raced in the All Japan Road Race Championship in the GP125 class, in the GP250 class, where he was champion in 2008, and in the JSB1000 class, where he was champion in 2017. He won the Suzuka 8 Hours in 2010 with Ryuichi Kiyonari and Takaaki Nakagami and in 2013 and 2014 with Michael van der Mark and Leon Haslam. A test rider for Honda Racing Corporation, Takahashi in 2015 made a wild card appearance in his home race in the MotoGP World Championship.

Career statistics

Grand Prix motorcycle racing

By season

Races by year
(key) (Races in bold indicate pole position, races in italics indicate fastest lap)

Superbike World Championship

Races by year
(key) (Races in bold indicate pole position, races in italics indicate fastest lap)

British Superbike Championship

By year

References

External links
 
 

1989 births
Living people
Japanese motorcycle racers
125cc World Championship riders
250cc World Championship riders
MotoGP World Championship riders
Superbike World Championship riders
Sportspeople from Saitama (city)